Wuhe is a town under the administration of Liangzhou District, Wuwei, Gansu, China. , it administers Wuhe Residential Community and the following eight villages:
Wuhe Village
Shajin Village
Wu'ai Village
Xiazhai Village
Houji Village
Shengli Village
Zhizhai Village
Xingou Village

References 

Township-level divisions of Gansu
Wuwei, Gansu